Dream High is a 2011 South Korean television series starring Bae Suzy, Kim Soo-hyun, Ok Taec-yeon, Hahm Eun-jung,  Jang Wooyoung and Lee Ji-eun. It aired on KBS2 from January 3 to February 28, 2011, on Mondays and Tuesdays at 22:00 (KST) for 16 episodes.

The drama was popular among teenagers, and brought in average viewership ratings of 15.7% during its two-month run. A special episode, where the cast of the show performed the Dream High Special Concert on a stage near Seoul, was aired on March 1, 2011, the day after the series ended.

Its sequel Dream High 2 aired a year later with a different cast.

Synopsis
Six students at Kirin High School share dreams of becoming K-pop idols, among others. During their school years, they learn how to develop their singing, songwriting and dancing skills while undergoing personal growth. They also start to develop feelings for one another. Each of them has their own strengths and weaknesses, but they strive to debut with the support and guidance of one another.

Cast

Main 

 Bae Suzy as Go Hye-mi
Lee Joo-yeon as young Go Hye-mi (Ep. 2 & 5)
She originally wanted to become an opera singer but is forced to take up mainstream pop to pay off her father's debt to a gangster.

Kim Soo-hyun as Song Sam-dong
A country bumpkin who is a music prodigy with a rare disease. He develops a one-sided crush on Hye-mi.

Ok Taec-yeon as Jin-guk/Hyun Shi-hyuk
Kang Yi-seok as young Jin-guk (Ep. 2, 5 & 10)
He has a contentious relationship with his father, the mayor, who hasn't acknowledged him as his son.

Hahm Eun-jung as Yoon Baek-hee
Formerly best friends with Hye-mi, the two become bitter enemies when Hye-mi betrays Baek-hee during an audition.

Jang Wooyoung as Jason
An American-born dancer who plans on making his entertainment debut in Korea.

Lee Ji-eun as Kim Pil-sook
She was discouraged from pursuing music because she was shy and overweight. She also has the gift of perfect pitch.

Supporting
Ahn Gil-kang as Ma Doo-shik
Ahn Sun-young as Kang Oh-sun (Oh-hyuk's older sister)
Ahn Seo-hyun as Go Hye-sung (Hye-mi's younger sister)
Park Eun-bin as 16-year-old Hye-sung (Ep. 16)
Lee Hye-sook as Song Nam-boon (Sam-dong's mother)
Choi Il-hwa as Hyun Moo-jin (Jin-guk's father)
Park Hyuk-kwon as Go Byung-jik (Hye-mi's father)
Jang Hee-soo as Kang Hee-seon (Baek-hee's mother)
Park Hwi-soon as Jin-gook's roommate (Ep. 1–2, 5)

Teachers in Kirin High School
Um Ki-joon as Kang Oh-hyuk
Lee Yoon-ji as Shi Kyung-jin
Park Jin-young as Yang Jin-man
Lee Byung-joon as Principal Shi Bum-soo
Lee Yoon-mi as Maeng Seung-hee
Baek Won-kil as Gong Min-chul
Bae Yong-joon as President Jung Ha-myung (Ep. 1–4)
Joo Young-hoon as the composing teacher (Ep. 11)

Students in Kirin High School
Jeon Ah-min as Jo In-sung (Jin-gook's friend)
JOO as Jung Ah-jung
Han Ji-hoo as Park Do-joon
Yoon Young-ah as Lee Ri-ah
Park Jin-sang as Jun Tae-san
Han Bo-reum as Ha So-hyun
Bae Noo-ri as Han So-ri (Ep. 6, 9, 12–13)

Special appearances
Sumi Jo as herself (Ep. 1)
Kim Hyun-joong as himself (Ep. 1)
Song Hae as variety show host (Ep. 2, 3)
Jay B as Jason's back up dancer (Ep. 3)
Young K as Jason's back up dancer (Ep. 3)
Shownu as Jason's back up dancer (Ep. 3)
Nichkhun as Lee Ri-ah's CF partner (Ep. 8)
Koo Jun-yup as himself (Ep. 9, 10)
Hwang Chan-sung as Oh-sun's imaginary boyfriend (Ep. 12)
Leeteuk as himself (Ep. 13)
Eunhyuk as himself (Ep. 13)
miss A as flash mob dancers (Ep. 16)
2AM as flash mob dancers (Ep. 16)
Dal Shabet as Baek-hee's students (Ep. 16)

Production
In January 2009, media outlets reported that Bae Yong-joon, hallyu actor and chairman of KeyEast, would co-produce a television drama with Park Jin-young's entertainment company JYP. A television drama production company, Holym, was established as a joint venture between KeyEast and JYP Entertainment. In April 2010, CJ Media signed a MoU with Holym becoming the part of production team. Bae being the creative producer of the drama, he provided overall concept, goals and ideas while Park composed the music and choreographed the dance for the series. The screenplay was written by Park Hye-ryun and the series was directed by Lee Eung-bok.

Bae Yong-joon was also part of the cast for four episodes making his first small screen appearance in three years. While Park Jin-young marked his acting debut with the series. Ok Taec-yeon and Jang Wooyoung from 2PM, Bae Suzy from Miss A, Hahm Eun-jung from T-ara, singer IU and Kim Soo-hyun were selected for the main cast. Kim was the only non-idol among the cast; but had studied music and dance at JYP Entertainment for 3 months in order to portray his role.

Original soundtrack

Chart performance

Plagiarism allegation 
While "Someday" fared well commercially and reached number one on the Gaon Digital Chart, it was embroiled in controversy after the song's writer and composer, Park Jin-young, was accused of plagiarizing the song, "To My Man". Songwriter Kim Shin-il won his plagiarism lawsuit against Park Jin-young in 2013, however, an appeal to the Supreme Court of Korea led to an eventual High Court retrial in 2015.

Reception
On October 5, 2011, Japan's daily paper Sankei Sports reported that Dream High was handed the Grand Prize and 'Hallyu award at the SKY PerfecTV! awards which took place in Tokyo.

On October 24, 2011, Dream High was given the Special Award for Foreign Drama at the 5th International Drama Festival held in Tokyo.

On December 31, 2011, Dream High won the following at the KBS Drama Awards: Best Supporting Actress for Lee Yoon-ji; Best New Actor and Popularity Award for Kim Soo-hyun; Best New Actress for Bae Suzy; and Best Couple Award for Kim Soo-hyun and Bae Suzy.

On May 10, 2012, Dream High was honored at the Rose d'Or, the global entertainment television festival ceremony which took place at Lucerne, Switzerland. It won the Golden Rose under the Youth category, the first ever Korean production to do so.

Dream High is one of the most watched South Korean dramas on Chinese video streaming platform Youku with over 26,300,000 views and an average of 2,000,000 views per episode (As of July 2016).

Ratings
In this table,  represent the lowest ratings and  represent the highest ratings.

Accolades

Awards and nominations

Listicles

Adaptations
 The drama was adapted into a Japanese stage musical, with Yuya Matsushita and Bright's Nanaka playing the roles of Song Sam-dong and Go Hye-mi, respectively.
 After the publication of Dream High Special Making Book in February 2011 which contained behind-the-scene stories and photos as well as special interviews with the show's cast, a two-volume "image novel" was also released featuring still cuts from the drama.
 On November 13, 2022, it was announced Dream High woul have a Korean stage musical. On January 26, 2023, it was confirmed that Dream High will be adapted into a Korean stage musical on which will be opened in May 2023.

Sequel
The sequel Dream High 2 aired a year later with a different cast, starring Kang So-ra, GOT7's JB and Jinyoung, 2AM's Jinwoon, T-ara's Jiyeon, SISTAR's Hyolyn, Ailee, and Park Seo-joon.

In episode 17 of My Love from the Star, Bae Suzy makes a special guest appearance as Go Hye-mi, the main protagonist (and the same character she plays in) of Dream High.

International broadcast

Media release 
In Japan, the series received a 2-Box Set DVD release on September 28, 2011 by Avex Japan, which were only available for purchase in the country. Due to the show's popularity and the success of the previous releases, Additional 2 Box-Sets were released in the country on August 3, 2012 under the same distributor.

Another DVD Box set featuring behind-the-scenes videos and interviews with the cast and staff was released on December 07 of the same year in Japan under Pony Canyon.

Notes

References

External links
  
 
 
 

2011 South Korean television series debuts
2011 South Korean television series endings
South Korean musical television series
South Korean romance television series
South Korean teen dramas
Korean Broadcasting System television dramas
Korean-language television shows
Television shows written by Park Hye-ryun
Television series by CJ E&M
Television series by JYP Entertainment
Television series by KeyEast
Dream High
Television series about teenagers
South Korean high school television series